Ambegudin     is a village development committee in the Himalayas of Taplejung District in the Province No. 1 of north-eastern Nepal. At the time of the 2011 Nepal census it had a population of 2,979 people living in 625 individual households. There were 1442 males and 1537 females at the time of census.

References

External links
UN map of the municipalities of Taplejung District

Populated places in Taplejung District